The Mammoth Book of Modern Science Fiction: Short Novels of the 1980s is a themed anthology of science fiction short works edited by Isaac Asimov, Martin H. Greenberg, and Charles G. Waugh, the sixth and last in a series of six samplers of the field from the 1930s through the 1980s. It was first published in trade paperback by Robinson in 1993. The first American edition was issued in trade paperback by Carroll & Graf in the same year.

The book collects ten novellas and novelettes by various science fiction authors that were originally published in the 1980s.

Contents
"Slow Music" (James Tiptree, Jr.)
"Le Croix (The Cross)" (Barry N. Malzberg)
"Scorched Supper on New Niger" (Suzy McKee Charnas)
"The Saturn Game" (Poul Anderson)
"Hardfought" (Greg Bear)
"Swarmer, Skimmer" (Gregory Benford)
"Sailing to Byzantium" (Robert Silverberg)
"Trinity" (Nancy Kress)
"The Blind Geometer" (Kim Stanley Robinson)
"Surfacing" (Walter Jon Williams)

Notes

1993 anthologies
Science fiction anthologies
Isaac Asimov anthologies
Martin H. Greenberg anthologies
Constable & Robinson books